Nowice  is a village in the urban-rural Gmina Jaworzyna Śląska, within Świdnica County, Lower Silesian Voivodeship, in south-western Poland. 

As of 2015, the town had 342 residents.

The total area of the town is .193 km2.

References

Nowice